Lake Lurleen is a public reservoir located in Tuscaloosa County, in west central Alabama. It is named after Lurleen Wallace, the first woman elected Governor of Alabama.  It is also the location of Lake Lurleen State Park.

Reservoirs in Alabama
Reservoirs in Tuscaloosa County, Alabama